Firstsource Solutions Limited is an Indian business process management company headquartered in Mumbai, India. It is owned by RP-Sanjiv Goenka Group.  

Firstsource provides business process management in the banking and financial services, customer services, telecom and media, and healthcare sectors. Its clients include financial services, telecommunications and healthcare companies. Firstsource hosts operations in India, US, UK, and the Philippines. 

The company is listed on the Bombay (BSE) and National Stock Exchange of India (NSE) since 2007. In 2021 Firstsource generated revenues of INR 50.8 Billion (US$670 million).

History 
Firstsource started its operations in 2001 as ICICI InfoTech Upstream Ltd, a business process outsourcing organisation wholly owned by ICICI Bank, India’s largest private financial services organisation. Its name was changed to Firstsource Solutions Limited in 2006. The same year, Firstsource opened a branch office in the Philippines. In 2007, it became a public company listed on the Indian Stock Exchange.

Acquisitions 
In 2002, the company acquired Customer Asset.com with its two subsidiaries and Tawny Dove Ltd. One year later they acquired FirstRing India Pvt Ltd to gain customer acquisition and credit card services capabilities. In 2005, they acquired RevIT to expand their services into the healthcare sector. One year later, in December 2006, they acquired Business Process Management Inc (BPM) with the aim to enhance the company capabilities in the healthcare sector. In November 2021, Firstsource announced to acquire the US mortgage services provider The StoneHill Group.

Public offer
Firstsource made a public offer in February 2007 and was listed on the National Stock Exchange (NSE) and Bombay Stock Exchange (BSE) in India on February 22, 2007.

Corporate affairs

Organizational structure 
Their 37 global operation centers are located across India, US, UK, and Philippines. The company provides services mostly to clients in United States and the United Kingdom.

Management and leadership structure 
Firstsource is managed by a leadership team with 11 members. Vipul Khanna serves as the Managing Director and Chief Executive Officer. The Board of Directors is led by Chairman Sanjiv Goenka.

Group Structure 
The RP-Sanjiv Goenka Group owns a 53.96% share of Firstsource through a subsidiary. Firstsource expanded with the acquisition of ISGN in 2016, which was rebranded as Sourcepoint in 2019. As of March 2018, Firstsource had 15 subsidiaries and 1 associate company.

Shareholder structure 
Major shareholders in Firstsource include CESC Ventures Limited (53.96%), ICICI Bank Limited (4.85%), Rakesh Jhunjhunwala (3.25%), Steinberg India Emerging Opportunities Fund Limited (1.44%), HDFC Small Cap Fund (5.33%), Mutual Funds (5.65%), foreign institutional investors (9.01%) and the remaining 16.51% is held by the public.

Products and services 
Firstsource is a business process management (BPM) company and offers their services in the Banking and Financial, Healthcare, Communication, Media and Technology and Diverse Industries. Service sectors include Contact and Service Centers, Platform Automation and Analytics and other Business Technology Services.

Awards and recognitions 

 2022: Bloomberg Gender Equality Index

See also 

 3i Infotech
 Fortune India 500
 List of IT consulting firms

References

External links
 

Business process outsourcing companies of India
Companies based in Mumbai
Business services companies established in 2001
Call centre companies
Outsourcing companies
Business process outsourcing companies of the Philippines
Business process outsourcing companies of the United States
Companies of Northern Ireland
Outsourcing in India
Indian companies established in 2001
RPG Group
2001 establishments in Maharashtra
Companies listed on the National Stock Exchange of India
Companies listed on the Bombay Stock Exchange
RPSG Group